Gregory Strong (born 5 September 1975) is an English former professional footballer who played as a defender. He was the manager of Rhyl from 2009 until 2015, and chief scout of Plymouth Argyle between 2015 and 2018. He is currently the Head of Recruitment at Morecambe FC.

Strong had a 20-year-long career in professional football where he was a typical journeyman playing for a large number of clubs. Strong played for Wigan Athletic, Bolton Wanderers, Blackpool, Stoke City, Motherwell, Hull City, Cheltenham Town, Scunthorpe United, Bury, Boston United, Macclesfield Town, Livingston, Dundee, Halifax Town, Northwich Victoria, Droylsden and Rhyl.

Playing career
Strong was born in Bolton and started his footballing career with Wigan Athletic in 1992 after playing for England schoolboys and youth international. He played two seasons with Wigan and then moved to his hometown club Bolton Wanderers in August 1995. He struggled to establish himself at Bolton making just 22 appearances for the club in four seasons. During that time he was loaned out to Blackpool where he made 12 appearances scoring one goal and Stoke City where he played five times in 1998–99 scoring once against his former club Wigan Athletic. He then moved to Scottish side Motherwell in the summer of 1999 where he became a popular player in two seasons at Fir Park.

He returned to England in 2002 when he was signed up by Hull City. After struggling to get games with Hull, Strong had loan spells with Cheltenham Town, Scunthorpe United, and Bury before moving on to Boston United. He spent a short loan at Macclesfield Town before moving to Scotland again to sign for Livingston in 2005.

After a season and a half at Livingston Strong joined Dundee in August 2006. However, he was released by Dundee in late 2006, and on 8 March 2007, he was signed by Conference side Halifax Town. He scored a goal on his debut for the Shaymen after just four minutes, but was released by the club at the end of the season, joining league rivals Northwich Victoria. Strong left Northwich in January 2008 joining Droylsden where he played for the rest of the season.

In the summer of 2008 he joined Welsh League side, Rhyl and he was appointed as player-manager at Rhyl in the summer of 2009. In May 2015 Strong left Rhyl FC by "mutual consent".

Post playing career
In July 2016, after the appointment of former Motherwell teammate Derek Adams as manager, Strong joined Plymouth Argyle as chief scout. He remained in the role until November 2018.

Strong was appointed Chief Scout of Morecambe in 2022 after a spell with Salford City in a similar role.

Career statistics
Source:

A.  The "Other" column constitutes appearances and goals in the Football League Trophy, Football League play-offs and Scottish Challenge Cup.

References

External links
 

1975 births
Living people
Footballers from Bolton
English footballers
Wigan Athletic F.C. players
Bolton Wanderers F.C. players
Blackpool F.C. players
Stoke City F.C. players
Motherwell F.C. players
Hull City A.F.C. players
Cheltenham Town F.C. players
Scunthorpe United F.C. players
Bury F.C. players
Boston United F.C. players
Macclesfield Town F.C. players
Livingston F.C. players
Dundee F.C. players
Halifax Town A.F.C. players
Northwich Victoria F.C. players
Rhyl F.C. players
Premier League players
English Football League players
National League (English football) players
Scottish Premier League players
English football managers
Rhyl F.C. managers
Cymru Premier managers
Droylsden F.C. players
Cymru Premier players
Plymouth Argyle F.C. non-playing staff
Association football defenders
Salford City F.C. non-playing staff
Morecambe F.C. non-playing staff